The Journal for the History of Analytical Philosophy (JHAP) is a peer-reviewed platinum standard open access academic journal.
It publishes research articles on the history of analytic philosophy. It is published by McMaster University Library Press. The editor-in-chief is Marcus Rossberg (University of Connecticut). JHAP published its first volume in 2011. The journal is indexed by The Philosophers' Index, PhilPapers, and Scopus.

References

External links

History of philosophy journals
Publications established in 2011
English-language journals